Sean Fraser (born 15 February 1983 in Kingston) is a retired Jamaican soccer player who last played for Harbour View.

Career

Youth
Fraser attended Camperdown High School, Vas Preparatory School, and attended Clarendon College in his native Jamaica, where he was a star player on the school's football team.

Professional
Fraser began his professional career on  the Jamaica National Premier League, playing for Harbour View and Portmore United. He transferred to Miami FC in the USL First Division in 2006 then went on loan to Brazilian club Boavista in Campeonato Carioca.

After two seasons in Florida, Fraser transferred to the Puerto Rico Islanders in January 2009. After one year with the Islanders Fraser signed with North East Stars in Trinidad.  In 2011, Fraser joined Once Municipal in El Salvador but moved on to fellow Salvadorans Alianza before the start of the 2012 Clausura championship.

In January 2013, Fraser moved to Pumas Morelos in the AscensoMX

In July 2013, Fraser returned to Alianza in El Salvador

International
Fraser played for Jamaica in the 1999 FIFA U-17 World Championship in New Zealand, appeared for the Jamaica U-20 team in the 2001 FIFA World Youth Championship in Argentina, and made his debut for the Jamaica national team in 2000 against the Cayman Islands. He was also part of the Jamaica national team that participated in the qualifying round of the Digicel Caribbean Cup in 2001.

Honors

Club
First Jamaican born and Caribbean player to win a golden boot award in Central America.

Puerto Rico Islanders
 CFU Club Championship: Runner-up 2009

References

External links
 Puerto Rico Islanders bio
 
 

1983 births
Living people
Sportspeople from Kingston, Jamaica
Jamaican footballers
Jamaica international footballers
Harbour View F.C. players
Portmore United F.C. players
Miami FC (2006) players
Boavista Sport Club players
Puerto Rico Islanders players
North East Stars F.C. players
Once Municipal footballers
Alianza F.C. footballers
C.D. Dragón footballers
Jamaican expatriate footballers
Jamaican expatriate sportspeople in Brazil
Jamaican expatriate sportspeople in Mexico
Jamaican expatriate sportspeople in the United States
Jamaican expatriate sportspeople in Trinidad and Tobago
Jamaican expatriate sportspeople in El Salvador
Jamaican expatriate sportspeople in Thailand
Jamaican expatriate sportspeople in Puerto Rico
Jamaican expatriate sportspeople in Vietnam
Expatriate footballers in Mexico
Expatriate soccer players in the United States
Expatriate footballers in Trinidad and Tobago
Expatriate footballers in El Salvador
Expatriate footballers in Thailand
Expatriate footballers in Puerto Rico
Expatriate footballers in Brazil
Expatriate footballers in Vietnam
Sean Fraser
USL First Division players
TT Pro League players
C.D. Águila footballers
Association football forwards